Oxford Literary Review is an academic journal of literary theory. The journal was founded in the late 1970s by Ian McLeod, Ann Wordsworth and Robert J. C. Young, and publishes articles on the history and development of deconstructive thinking in intellectual, cultural and political life. Oxford Literary Review has published new work by Jacques Derrida, Maurice Blanchot, Roland Barthes, Michel Foucault, Philippe Lacoue-Labarthe, Jean-Luc Nancy, and Hélène Cixous, and continues to publish new work in the tradition and spirit of deconstruction.

The journal was originally published termly (i.e. three times a year), then bi-annually, though for some years it appeared as a "double issue" as an annual publication. The Oxford Literary Review is now published twice yearly by Edinburgh University Press in July and December. Special issues on specific themes alternate with general issues which include articles from varied intellectual disciplines on issues and writers belonging to or engaging with the work of deconstructive thinking (such as Martin Heidegger, Maurice Blanchot, Emmanuel Levinas, and Luce Irigaray).

Editors 
 Geoffrey Bennington, Emory University
 Timothy Clark, University of Durham
 Peggy Kamuf, University of Southern California
 Michael Naas, De Paul University, Chicago
 Nicholas Royle, University of Sussex
 Sarah Wood, University of Kent

External links 
 

Edinburgh University Press academic journals
Deconstruction
Postmodernism
Literary magazines published in the United Kingdom
Publications associated with the University of Oxford
Publications with year of establishment missing